The Austria men's national field hockey team represents Austria in men's international field hockey.

Austria mainly competes in the Men's EuroHockey Championship II where they finished second twice. They also have qualified five times for the European championship where they finished seventh in 2009 and 2017. They have never qualified for the World Cup but they have played in three Olympic Games, their last appearance was in 1952.

Competitive record

Summer Olympics

European championships

Hockey World League and FIH Series

*Draws include matches decided on a penalty shoot-out.

Players

Current squad
The following 18 players were named on 16 August 2022 for the 2022 EuroHockey Championship Qualifier in Vienna, Austria from 23 to 26 August 2022.

Caps updated as of 26 August 2022, after the match against Croatia.

Recent call-ups
The following players have been called up for the national team in the last 12 months.

See also
Austria women's national field hockey team

References

External links
Official website
FIH profile

Field hockey
European men's national field hockey teams
National team
Field hockey